Anjileh may refer to:
 Anjileh, Kurdistan
 Anjileh, Qom